Spring Ridge is an unincorporated community and census-designated place (CDP) in Gilchrist County, Florida, United States. The population was 442 at the 2020 census.

Geography
Spring Ridge is located in northeastern Gilchrist County, to the east of Florida State Road 47 and south of the Santa Fe River.

Demographics

References

Census-designated places in Gilchrist County, Florida
Gainesville metropolitan area, Florida
Unincorporated communities in Florida